Sochi is a city in Krasnodar Krai, Russia.

Sochi may also refer to:
Sochi River, a river in Krasnodar Krai, Russia
Sochi International Airport, an airport in Sochi, Russia
Sochi railway station, a railway station in Krasnodar Krai, Russia
Port of Sochi, a Russian sea port on the Black Sea
FC Sochi-04, former association football club based in Sochi, Russia
PFC Sochi, a professional football club based in Sochi, Russia, former FC Dynamo Saint Petersburg
HC Sochi, an ice hockey team based in Sochi, Russia

See also
Sochi Central Stadium, a multi-purpose stadium in Sochi, Russia
2014 Winter Olympics, XXII edition of the Winter Olympics held in Sochi, Russia
2014 Winter Paralympics, XI edition of the Winter Paralympics held in Sochi, Russia
Sochi bid for the 2014 Winter Olympics
Soshi (disambiguation)